The Serie A1 di pallanuoto maschile is the premier division of the Italian water polo male national championship. First held in 1912, it is currently contested by twelve teams. Pro Recco is Serie A1's most successful club with 32 titles since 1959, followed by CN Posillipo with eleven.

Current teams
The following 14 clubs compete in the Serie A1 during the 2022–23 season:

Previous winners

 1912:  Genoa
 1913:  Genoa 
 1914:  Genoa 
 1915-18 – Not held due to World War I
 1919:  Genoa 
 1920: Rari Nantes Milano
 1921:  Andrea Doria
 1922:  Andrea Doria 
 1923:  Sportiva Sturla
 1924 – Not played
 1925:  Andrea Doria 
 1926:  Andrea Doria 
 1927:  Andrea Doria 
 1928:  Andrea Doria 
 1929:  Triestina
 1930:  Andrea Doria 
 1931:  Andrea Doria 
 1932: Rari Nantes Milano 
 1933:  Rari Nantes Florentia
 1934:  Rari Nantes Florentia 
 1935:  Rari Nantes Camogli
 1936:  Rari Nantes Florentia 
 1937:  Rari Nantes Florentia 
 1938:  Rari Nantes Florentia 
 1939: Napoli
 1940:  Rari Nantes Florentia 
 1941: Napoli 
 1942: Napoli 
 1943-45 – Not held due to World War II
 1946:  Rari Nantes Camogli 
 1947: Canottieri Olona
 1948:  Rari Nantes Florentia 
 1949: Napoli 
 1950: Napoli 
 1951: Canottieri Napoli
 1952:  Rari Nantes Camogli 
 1953:  Rari Nantes Camogli 
 1954: Roma
 1955:  Rari Nantes Camogli 
 1956: Lazio
 1957:  Rari Nantes Camogli 
 1958: Canottieri Napoli 
 1959:  Pro Recco
 1960:  Pro Recco 
 1961:  Pro Recco 
 1962:  Pro Recco 
 1963: Canottieri Napoli 
 1964:  Pro Recco 
 1965:  Pro Recco 
 1966:  Pro Recco 
 1967:  Pro Recco 
 1968:  Pro Recco 
 1969:  Pro Recco 
 1970:  Pro Recco 
 1971:  Pro Recco 
 1972:  Pro Recco 
 1973: Canottieri Napoli 
 1974:  Pro Recco 
 1975: Canottieri Napoli 
 1976: Florentia 
 1977: Canottieri Napoli 
 1978:  Pro Recco 
 1979: Canottieri Napoli 
 1980: Florentia 
 1981: Bogliasco
 1982:  Pro Recco 
 1983:  Pro Recco 
 1983–84:  Pro Recco 
 1984–85:  Circolo Nautico Posillipo
 1985–86:  Circolo Nautico Posillipo 
 1986–87: Pescara
 1987–88:  Circolo Nautico Posillipo 
 1988–89:  Circolo Nautico Posillipo 
 1989–90: Canottieri Napoli 
 1990–91: Savona
 1991–92: Savona 
 1992–93:  Circolo Nautico Posillipo 
 1993–94:  Circolo Nautico Posillipo 
 1994–95:  Circolo Nautico Posillipo 
 1995–96:  Circolo Nautico Posillipo 
 1996–97: Pescara 
 1997–98: Pescara 
 1998–99: Roma 
 1990–00:  Circolo Nautico Posillipo 
 2000–01:  Circolo Nautico Posillipo 
 2001–02:  Pro Recco 
 2002–03:  Leonessa 
 2003–04:  Circolo Nautico Posillipo 
 2004–05: Savona 
 2005–06:  Pro Recco 
 2006–07:  Pro Recco 
 2007–08:  Pro Recco 
 2008–09:  Pro Recco 
 2009–10:  Pro Recco 
 2010–11:  Pro Recco 
 2011–12:  Pro Recco 
 2012–13:  Pro Recco 
 2013–14:  Pro Recco 
 2014–15:  Pro Recco 
 2015–16:  Pro Recco 
 2016–17:  Pro Recco 
 2017–18:  Pro Recco 
 2018–19:  Pro Recco 
 2019–20 – not assigned due to the COVID-19 pandemic.
 2020–21:  AN Brescia 
 2021–22:  Pro Recco 
 2022–23

Notes
1915–18: Cancelled due to war.
1924: Not played.
1943–45: Cancelled due to war.
2019–20: Suspended and then permanently interrupted for the COVID-19 pandemic.

Performances

Performance by club
The teams in Bold play in the 2015-16 season of Serie A1. 
The teams in Italics no longer exist.

 The bolded teams are currently playing in the 2014-15 season of the Italian League.

Regions 
The following table lists the Italian water polo champions by regions of Italy.

 The bolded teams are currently playing in the 2014-15 season of the Italian League.

Italian clubs in European competitions

References

External links
 Official website 
 Serie A1 at Waterpolo Development World 

Ita
Water polo competitions in Italy
Waterpolo